Senator Harsbrouck may refer to:

Abraham J. Hasbrouck (1773–1845), New York State Senate
Louis Hasbrouck (1777–1834), New York State Senate